The 1996 Stockholm Open was a men's tennis tournament played on indoor carpet courts at the Kungliga tennishallen in Stockholm, Sweden and was part of the World Series of the 1996 ATP Tour. It was the 28th edition of the tournament and was held from 4 November until 10 November 1996. Third-seeded Thomas Enqvist won his second consecutive singles title at the event.

Finals

Singles

 Thomas Enqvist defeated  Todd Martin 7–5, 6–4, 7–6(7–0)
 It was Enqvist's 3rd singles title of the year and the 10th of his career.

Doubles

 Patrick Galbraith /  Jonathan Stark defeated  Todd Martin /  Chris Woodruff 7–6, 6–4
 It was Galbraith's 5th title of the year and the 29th of his career. It was Stark's 2nd title of the year and the 17th of his career.

References

External links
  
 ATP tournament profile
 ITF tournament edition details

 
Stockholm Open
Stockholm Open
Stockholm Open
Stockholm Open
1990s in Stockholm